Callin' Me may refer to:

"Callin' Me" (Lil' Zane song), 2000
"Callin' Me", a song by Consequence from Don't Quit Your Day Job!, 2007
"Callin' Me", a song by Mac from Shell Shocked, 1998
"Callin Me", a song by PSD from All I Want, 2002